Thomas Greenwell may refer to:

 Thomas George Greenwell (1894–1967), British politician
 Tom Greenwell (1956–2013), judge in Texas, United States